is the first cover album by Japanese singer Shizuka Kudo. It was released on October 30, 2002, through Extasy Japan, marking her last release with the label. As the title evokes, the album features a selection of songs from the Shōwa period. It includes covers of artists such as Hiroko Yakushimaru, Mayumi Itsuwa, Kenji Sawada, Naoko Ken and Yōsui Inoue, among others. Kudo also recorded Japanese covers of "Moliendo Café", first recorded by Mario Suárez, and "Tennessee Waltz", originally recorded by Patti Page. The songs were originally covered in Japan by Sachiko Nishida and Chiemi Eri, respectively.

Critical reception
Kudo was praised for modernizing popular songs from the Shōwa period and for her more personal song choice.

Commercial performance
Shōwa no Kaidan Vol. 1 debuted at number 66 on the Oricon Albums Chart. It charted in the top 100 for a sole week, selling a total of 5,000 copies.

Track listing

Charts

References

2002 albums
Covers albums
Shizuka Kudo albums
Pony Canyon albums